The 1983 South American Rugby Championship was the 13th edition of the competition of the leading national Rugby Union teams in South America.

The tournament was played in Buenos Aires and won by Argentina .

Standings 

{| class="wikitable"
|-
!width=165|Team
!width=40|Played
!width=40|Won
!width=40|Drawn
!width=40|Lost
!width=40|For
!width=40|Against
!width=40|Difference
!width=40|Pts
|- bgcolor=#ccffcc align=center
|align=left| 
|3||3||0||0||118||15||+ 103||6
|- align=center
|align=left| 
|3||2||0||1||51||44||+ 7||4
|- align=center
|align=left| 
|3||1||0||2||33||83||- 50||2
|- align=center
|align=left| 
|3||0||0||3||27||87||- 60||0
|}

Results 

First round

Second round

Third Round

Notes

References

1983
1983 rugby union tournaments for national teams
1983 in Argentine rugby union
rugby union
rugby union
rugby union
International rugby union competitions hosted by Argentina